Lúdas Matyi ("Matyi the Goose-boy") was a satirical weekly magazine Hungary  during 1945–1993, the first and the only satirical one during the Communist times. It was named after the protagonist of the poem Matyi the Goose-boy.

It should be distinguished from the short-lived magazine with the same name launched in 1867.

References

1945 establishments in Hungary
1993 disestablishments in Hungary
Defunct magazines published in Hungary
Satirical magazines published in Europe
Magazines established in 1945
Magazines disestablished in 1993
Magazines published in Hungary
Hungarian-language magazines